Jobe Caesar (born 1 January 1999) is a Guyanese professional footballer who plays as a midfielder for GFF Elite League club Guyana Defence Force and the Guyana national team.

Early life 
Caesar started playing football at the age of 8, and it was at Santos that his skills were "honed and fine-tuned". When he was young, he was a resident of Bent Street, Wortmanville in Georgetown, where he played with future Guyana international Daniel Wilson. "We used to go opposite Cuffy Square at that small field which was there to play with Daniel Wilson and a small group in the afternoons and evenings", recalled Caesar in an interview with Kaieteur Sport in 2021.

Caesar attended St. Sidewell’s Primary School, which is situated opposite the field where he started playing football. He later attended St. Mary's Secondary School and Chase's Academy, securing a football scholarship at the latter.

Club career 
Caesar began his professional career at Santos. He went on to sign for Fruta Conquerors, where he won the GFF Elite League on two occasions. After his Fruta Conquerors spell, he returned to Santos before making a move to the Guyana Defence Force in 2021.

International career 
A former Guyana youth international at under-17 and under-20 level, Caesar made his debut for the senior Guyana national team in a 3–0 loss to Trinidad and Tobago on 25 March 2021 in FIFA World Cup qualification.

Honours 
Fruta Conquerors
 GFF Elite League: 2017–18, 2019

References

External links 
 
 

1999 births
Living people
Guyanese footballers
Association football midfielders
Guyana international footballers
Guyana youth international footballers
Guyana under-20 international footballers
Santos FC (Guyana) players
Fruta Conquerors FC players
Guyana Defence Force FC players
GFF Elite League players